The collared sprite or collared pipistrelle (Thainycteris aureocollaris) is a species of vesper bat found in Laos and Thailand.

References

Thainycteris
Mammals described in 1996
Bats of Southeast Asia
Taxonomy articles created by Polbot